Roy Crawford Wheeler (4 February 1909 – 16 March 1971) was an Australian politician. Born in Gosford, New South Wales, he was educated at state schools before running a business in Gosford. He subsequently became a stockbroker in Sydney, and underwent military service from 1940–46. In 1949, he was elected to the Australian House of Representatives as a member of the Liberal Party, representing the new seat of Mitchell. He held the seat until his defeat in 1961. Wheeler died in 1971.

References

|-

1909 births
1971 deaths
Liberal Party of Australia members of the Parliament of Australia
Members of the Australian House of Representatives for Mitchell
Members of the Australian House of Representatives
Australian stockbrokers
20th-century Australian politicians